John I, Lord of Polanen ( – 26 September 1342) was Lord of Polanen, Lord of De Lek and Lord of Breda.

Life 
John was a son of Philips III van Duivenvoorde (?-c. 1308) and Elisabeth van Vianen.

Lord of Polanen 
Upon the death of his father, John I became Lord of Polanen Castle. In his early years, John got help from his uncle Diederik van der Wale.

Lord of Heemskerk 
In 1327 John bought Oud Haerlem  Castle and the lordships of Heemskerk and Castricum. The price was only 100 pounds. 

In 1328 John took part in the Battle of Cassel, and in 1329 he was knighted. In 1339 he became bailiff of Kennemerland

Lord of Breda
In 1322 John married Catharina van Van Brederode (died 1372). He was the father of John II, Lord of Polanen.

References

Notes

External links 
 Entry at genealogieonline.nl

13th-century births
Year of birth unknown
1342 deaths
House of Polanen
Lords of Breda
14th-century people of the Holy Roman Empire